New Gods are a fictional extraterrestrial race featured in the DC Comics series The New Gods. 

New Gods may also refer to:

New Gods (album), an album and its title track by Withered Hand
New Gods: Nezha Reborn, a 2021 Chinese film by Zhao Ji
Ascend: Hand of Kul, formerly titled Ascend: New Gods, a 2013 video game
"New Gods", a song by Grimes from the album Miss Anthropocene